Brvenica is a South Slavic toponym. It may refer to:

Brvenica Municipality, North Macedonia
Brvenica, North Macedonia, village which is home to the municipal seat
Brvenica, Raška, a village in Serbia

See also
Brvenik, a village in Serbia
Brvenik Naselje, a village in Serbia